Serge Panine is a 1939 French drama film directed by Charles Méré and Paul Schiller and starring Françoise Rosay, Pierre Renoir and Andrée Guize. It was based on a novel of the same title by Georges Ohnet.

The film's art direction was by Émile Duquesne.

Cast
 Françoise Rosay as Madame Devarenne  
 Pierre Renoir as Cayrol 
 Andrée Guize as Jeanne  
 Sylvia Bataille as Micheline  
 Youcca Troubetzkov as Serge Panine  
 Lucien Rozenberg as Duc 
 Denise Grey as Lady Harton  
 Jacques Henley as Lord Harton  
 Claude Lehmann as Pierre  
 Elisa Ruis

References

Bibliography 
 Goble, Alan. The Complete Index to Literary Sources in Film. Walter de Gruyter, 1999.

External links 
 

1939 films
1939 drama films
French drama films
1930s French-language films
Films directed by Charles Méré
Films scored by Michel Michelet
Films based on French novels
Films based on works by Georges Ohnet
French black-and-white films
1930s French films